Mansergh  is a village and civil parish in the South Lakeland district of the English county of Cumbria. In the 2001 census the parish had a population of 141, decreasing  at the 2011 census to 124.

St Peter's Parish Church was built in 1880, and is Grade II listed.

See also

Listed buildings in Mansergh, Cumbria

References

External links 
 Cumbria County History Trust: Mansergh (nb: provisional research only – see Talk page)
 A Vision of Britain Through Time
 British Listed Buildings
 Genuki
 Geograph

South Lakeland District
Villages in Cumbria
Civil parishes in Cumbria